Robert Lawrence Gladney (born August 27, 1957) is a Canadian former professional ice hockey player. He played in 14 NHL games for the Los Angeles Kings and Pittsburgh Penguins.

Career statistics

External links
 

1957 births
Living people
Canadian ice hockey defencemen
Cincinnati Stingers draft picks
Ice hockey people from Newfoundland and Labrador
Los Angeles Kings players
People from Newfoundland (island)
Pittsburgh Penguins players
Toronto Maple Leafs draft picks
Oshawa Generals players
Baltimore Skipjacks players
New Brunswick Hawks players